The Museum of Flight is a private non-profit air and space museum near Seattle, Washington

Museum of Flight may also refer to:

 Canadian Museum of Flight in Langley, British Columbia
 National Museum of Flight in East Lothian, Scotland
Museum of Flight in Seattle, Washington
 Southern Museum of Flight in Birmingham, Alabama
 Western Museum of Flight in Hawthorne, California